Bathyaethiops is a genus of African tetras that are found in Cameroon, Congo and Democratic Republic of Congo.

Species
There are currently 6 recognized species in this genus:
 Bathyaethiops atercrinis Mamonekene & Stiassny, 2012 (Black-fin moon tetra) 
 Bathyaethiops baka Moritz & Schliewen, 2016 (Dwarf moon tetra) 
 Bathyaethiops breuseghemi (Poll, 1945) (Rectangle-spot moon tetra)
 Bathyaethiops caudomaculatus (Pellegrin, 1925) (African moon tetra)
 Bathyaethiops flammeus Moritz & Schliewen, 2016 (Red-back moon tetra) 
 Bathyaethiops greeni Fowler, 1949 (Green's moon tetra)

References

Alestidae
Fish of Africa
Taxa named by Henry Weed Fowler